Abby Rockefeller may  refer to:

 Abby Rockefeller (ecologist) (born 1943), American ecologist and feminist from the Rockefeller family
 Abby Aldrich Rockefeller (1874–1948), socialite and philanthropist, grandmother of the ecologist
 Abby Rockefeller Mauzé (1903–1976), philanthropist, daughter of the socialite and aunt of the ecologist